Ben is frequently used as a shortened version of the given names Benjamin, Benedict, Bennett or Benson, and is also a given name in its own right.

Abraham ben Abraham. Bar-, "son of" in Aramaic, is also seen, e.g. Simon bar Kokhba. 

Ben meaning "son of" is also found in Arabic as Ben (dialectal Arabic) or  bin (بن), Ibn/ebn (ابن).

Ben (賁/贲) is a Chinese surname.

People with the given name
 Ben Adams (born 1981), member of the British boy band A1
 Ben Affleck (born 1972), American Academy Award-winning actor and screenwriter
 Ben Ashkenazy (born 1968/69), American billionaire real estate developer
 Ben Askren (born 1984), American sport wrestler and mixed martial artist
 Ben Banogu (born 1996), American football player
 Ben Barba (born 1989), Australian rugby player
 Ben Barnes (disambiguation), multiple people
 Ben Bartch (born 1998), American football player
 Ben Bartlett, British composer
 Ben Becker (born 1964), German actor 
 Ben Bernanke (born 1953), American chair of the Federal Reserve Bank
 Ben Bishop (born 1986), American ice hockey player
 Ben Bradlee (1921–2014), American newspaper editor
 Ben Braun (born 1953), American basketball coach
 Ben Bredeson (born 1999), American football player
 Ben Browder (born 1962), American actor
 Ben Burman (1896–1984), American author
 Ben Burr-Kirven (born 1997), American football player
 Ben Carson (born 1951), American surgeon and politician
 Ben Carter (disambiguation), multiple people
 Ben Chase (1923–1998), American football player
 Ben Chilwell (born 1996), English footballer
 Ben Cleveland (born 1998), American football player
 Ben Clime (1891–1973), American football player
 Ben Cohen (disambiguation), multiple people
 Ben Coleman (disambiguation), multiple people
 Ben Collins, American screenwriter
 Ben Cousins (born 1978), Australian rules footballer
 Ben Crenshaw (born 1952), American golfer
 Ben Crompton (born 1974), English actor
 Ben Cross (1947–2020), English actor
 Ben Curtis (disambiguation), multiple people
 Ben Cutting (born 1987), Australian cricketer
 Ben Daley (born 1988), Australian rugby player
 Ben Davis (born 2000), Thai footballer
 Ben DiNucci (born 1996), American football player
 Ben Domenech (b. 1982), American news commentator, publisher of The Federalist
 Ben Eager (born 1984), Canadian ice hockey player
 Ben Edwards (disambiguation), multiple people
 Ben Eisenhardt (born 1990), American-Israeli basketball player
 Ben Ellefson (born 1996), American football player
 Ben Fayot (born 1937), Luxembourgian politician
 Ben Feldman (actor) (born 1980), American actor
 Ben Folds (born 1966), American singer-songwriter
Ben Fordham (born 1976), Australian journalist, sports reporter and radio presenter
 Ben Franklin (1706-1790), Prominent figure in the American Revolution
 Ben Garland (born 1988), American football player
 Ben Gedeon (born 1994), American football player
 Ben Gibbard (born 1976), American lead singer of Death Cab for Cutie
 Ben Gibson (born 1993), English footballer
 Ben Gillies (born 1979), Australian drummer of Silverchair
 Ben Godfrey (born 1998), English footballer
 Ben Gordon (born 1983), British-born American basketball player
 Ben Gottschalk (born 1992), American football player
 Ben Guez (born 1987), American baseball player
 Ben Hannant (born 1984), Australian rugby player
 Ben Harper (born 1969), American musician
 Ben Harvey (disambiguation), multiple people
 Ben Hogan (1912–1997), American golfer
 Ben Helfgott (born 1929), Polish-born British weightlifter
 Ben Howard (born 1987), British singer/songwriter
 Ben Hunt (disambiguation), multiple people
 Ben Jackson (disambiguation), multiple people
 Ben Jeby (1909–1985), American boxer
 Ben Jelen (born 1979), American singer
 Ben Johns (born 1999), an American professional pickleball player
 Ben Johnson (disambiguation), multiple people 
 Ben Jonson (1572–1637), English poet
 Ben Kane (born 1970), English novelist
 Ben Kasica, American musician, lead guitarist for Skillet
 Ben Keays (born 1997), Australian rules footballer
 Ben E. King (1938–2015), American soul and R&B singer
 Ben Kingsley (born 1943), British actor
 Ben Kinsella (1991–2008), British murder victim
 Ben Knapen (born 1951), Dutch politician and journalist
 Ben Kweller (born 1981), American rock musician
 Ben Lawson (born 1980), Australian actor 
 Ben Leber (born 1978), American football player
 Ben Lowe (born 1985), Australian rugby player
 Ben Mason (disambiguation), multiple people
 Ben Mendelsohn (born 1969), Australian actor 
 Ben Miller (born 1966), English actor and comedian
 Ben Moody (born 1981), American musician
Ben Moore (born 1995), American basketball player in the Israeli Basketball Premier League
 Ben Roy Mottelson (1926–2022), Danish American physicist
 Ben Mulroney (born 1976), Canadian television personality
 Ben Murdoch-Masila (born 1991), New Zealand rugby player
 Ben Navarro (born 1962/1963), American billionaire, founder and CEO of Sherman Financial Group
 Ben Needham (1989–1991), British infant who disappeared in Greece
 Ben Needham (American football), American football linebacker
 Ben Nicholson (1894–1982), English artist
 Ben Niemann (born 1995), American football player
 Ben Ownby, American kidnap victim
 Ben J. Pierce (born 1999), American YouTuber, singer-songwriter, and actor
 Ben Plucknett (1954–2002), American discus thrower
 Ben Powers (American football) (born 1997), American football player
 Ben Richards (disambiguation), multiple people
 Ben Roethlisberger (born 1982), American football player
 Ben Sahar (born 1989), Israeli footballer
 Ben Schwartz (born 1981), American actor
 Ben Selvin (1898–1980), American jazz musician and bandleader
 Ben Shneiderman (born 1947), American computer scientist
 Ben Simmons (born 1996), Australian basketball player
 Ben Shapiro (born 1984), American conservative political commentator
 Ben Sheets (born 1978), American baseball player
 Ben Silverman (golfer) (born 1987), Canadian golfer
 Ben Skowronek (born 1997), American football player
 Ben Smith (disambiguation), multiple people
 Ben Spijkers (born 1961), Dutch judoka
 Ben Stein (born 1944), American law professor, economist, writer and actor
 Ben Stiller (born 1965), American actor, writer and director
 Ben Swagerman (born 1959), Dutch politician
 Ben Talley (born 1972), American football player
 Ben Tapper, American social media influencer and chiropractor
 Ben Templeton (born 1940), American co-creator of the comic strip Motley's Crew
 Ben Te'o (born 1987), New Zealand rugby player
 Ben Thatcher (born 1975), English footballer
 Ben Tulfo (born 1955), Filipino television and radio personality
 Ben Underwood (disambiguation), multiple people
 Ben Unwin (1977–2019), Australian actor
 Ben Vautier (born 1935), French artist
 Ben Verweij (1895–1951), Dutch footballer
 Ben Wallace (born 1974), American basketball player
 Ben Wanger (born 1997), American-Israeli baseball pitcher, Team Israel
 Ben Way (born 1980), English entrepreneur
 Ben Whishaw (born 1980), English actor
 Ben Wildman-Tobriner (born 1984), American swimmer
 Ben Wilson (disambiguation), multiple people
 Ben Woodburn (born 1999), Welsh footballer
 Ben (South Korean singer) (born 1991), South Korean singer

Fictional characters
 Ben, a character in the 2007 Canadian-American television series Sushi Pack
 Ben, a character in the 2009 American romantic comedy-drama movie He's Just Not That Into You
 Ben, a rat in the eponymous movie, and theme song sung by Michael Jackson on his LP Ben
 Benjamin Florian/Ben, a protagonist of the Descendants franchise (2015–2019)
 Gentle Ben, a bear featured in an eponymous 1965 novel, and in television and movie adaptations
 Ben C. L. / Soldier Boy, major character in the third season of The Boys
 Ben Harper, major character in the comedy series My Family
 Ben Kenobi, an alias of Obi-Wan Kenobi, major character in the film saga, Star Wars
 Ben Lawson/BEN, an antagonist of the Ben Drowned series (2010-20)
 Ben, or Benny, the "1980-something space guy" from The Lego Movie
 Old Ben, a bear at the center of the William Faulkner story The Bear
 Ben Packer, one of the five main protagonists in Bureau of Alien Detectors
 Ben Parker, the uncle of Peter Parker (Spider-Man) from Marvel Comics
 Ben, minor character of The Grudge 3
 Ben, Bill's brother in The Railway Series and the spinoff TV series Thomas and Friends
 Ben Richards, main character of The Running Man
 Ben Ripley, a major protagonist of the young-adult series, Spy School
 Ben Skywalker, a major character in the Star Wars expanded universe
 Ben Solo, major character in the Star Wars sequel trilogy
 Ben Tennyson, protagonist of the Cartoon Network's Ben 10 media franchise
 Ben Urich, investigative journalist for The Daily Bugle in the Marvel Universe
 Ben Wyatt, character from Parks and Recreation
 Talking Ben, a brown dog and a protagonist of the Talking Tom & Friends media franchise
 Ben Taylor from Postman Pat
 Ben Hargreeves, main character in the comic book/Netflix series The Umbrella Academy
 Ben Elf, the titular protagonist in the British cartoon Ben and Holly's Little Kingdom

See also

All pages containing Ben

Masculine given names
Hebrew-language surnames
English masculine given names
Hypocorisms